Army Squad is a hip hop group from Angola. They started entering the hip hop game in early 1990s and are now one of the best known Angolan hip hop groups. They were once part of a group called Bue and Heavy C is featured in many of Army Squad's songs such as "Cabeca Vazia" and "Conselho de Amigo".

Like many other Angolan rappers, Army Squad is helping to raise awareness of the Angolan hip hop scene all over the world. Their music varies from love songs like "Pel Castanha" or "Conselho de Amigo" to gangsta rap like their hits "Firme" and "Cabeça Vazia".

External links
Info on Army Squad at africanhiphop.com
  Radio From Angola and free MP3

Living people
Angolan hip hop groups
Year of birth missing (living people)
1990s establishments in Angola